The 2018–19 Florida Gators men's basketball team represented the University of Florida in the 2018–19 NCAA Division I men's basketball season. The Gators were led by fourth-year head coach Mike White and played their home games in the Exactech Arena at the Stephen C. O'Connell Center on the university's Gainesville, Florida campus as members of the Southeastern Conference. They finished 20-16, 9-9 to finish 8th please. In the SEC Tournament, they defeated Arkansas, beat LSU in quarterfinals before losing to Auburn in the semifinals. They received a at-large bid to the NCAA Tournament where they defeated Nevada in the First Round before losing in the Second Round to Michigan.

Previous season 
The Gators finished the 2017–18 season 21–13, 11–7 in SEC play to finish in third place. They lost in the quarterfinals of the SEC tournament to Arkansas. They received an at-large bid to the NCAA tournament where they defeated St. Bonaventure in the First Round before losing in the Second Round to Texas Tech.

Offseason

Departures

2018 recruiting class

Roster

Schedule and results

|-
!colspan=12 style=| Exhibition

|-
!colspan=12 style=| Regular season

|-
!colspan=12 style=|SEC Tournament

|-
!colspan=12 style=|NCAA tournament

Source

Rankings

*AP does not release post-NCAA Tournament rankings

References

Florida Gators men's basketball seasons
Florida
Florida